Wege is a form of weg, which means way in several Germanic languages. 

Wege of WEGE may refer to

Wege (surname), people with the name
WEGE, radio station in Lima, Ohio
Wege zum Glück, a German telenovela
Bianca – Wege zum Glück
Julia – Wege zum Glück
Bereitet die Wege, bereitet die Bahn, BWV 132, a church cantata by Johann Sebastian Bach